Boucardicus albocinctus is a species of land snail with an operculum, a terrestrial gastropod mollusk in the family Cyclophoridae.

This species is endemic to Madagascar. It lives in subtropical or tropical dry forests. The survival of this species is threatened by habitat destruction.

References

Boucardicus
Molluscs of Madagascar
Gastropods described in 1893
Taxonomy articles created by Polbot
Endemic fauna of Madagascar